The 2017–18 San Miguel Beermen season was the 43rd season of the franchise in the Philippine Basketball Association (PBA).

Key dates

2017
October 29: The 2017 PBA draft took place in Midtown Atrium, Robinsons Place Manila.

Draft picks

Roster

Philippine Cup

Eliminations

Standings

Game log

|-bgcolor=ccffcc
| 1
| December 17
| Phoenix
| W 104–96
| June Mar Fajardo (23)
| June Mar Fajardo (16)
| Chris Ross (9)
| Smart Araneta Coliseum5,600
| 1–0
|-bgcolor=ccffcc
| 2
| December 27
| Meralco
| W 103–97
| Alex Cabagnot (29)
| Arwind Santos (10)
| Chris Ross (7)
| Ynares Center
| 2–0

|-bgcolor=ccffcc
| 3
| January 13
| TNT
| W 88–76
| June Mar Fajardo (20)
| Alex Cabagnot (12)
| Chris Ross (8)
| University of San Agustin Gym
| 3–0
|-bgcolor=ccffcc
| 4
| January 19
| NLEX
| W 109–98
| Arwind Santos (26)
| June Mar Fajardo (16)
| Alex Cabagnot (9)
| Cuneta Astrodome
| 4–0
|-bgcolor=ccffcc
| 5
| January 24
| GlobalPort
| W 107–93
| June Mar Fajardo (34)
| June Mar Fajardo (13)
| Arwind Santos (6)
| Smart Araneta Coliseum
| 5–0
|-bgcolor=ffcccc
| 6
| January 28
| Barangay Ginebra
| L 96–100
| June Mar Fajardo (33)
| June Mar Fajardo (11)
| Chris Ross (6)
| Smart Araneta Coliseum
| 5–1

|-bgcolor=ccffcc
| 7
| February 4
| Magnolia
| W 77–76
| June Mar Fajardo (19)
| June Mar Fajardo (21)
| Marcio Lassiter (5)
| Ynares Center
| 6–1
|-bgcolor=ffcccc
| 8
| February 9
| Blackwater
| L 96–106
| Arwind Santos (22)
| June Mar Fajardo (13)
| Chris Ross (7)
| Cuneta Astrodome
| 6–2
|-bgcolor=ccffcc
| 9
| February 17
| Alaska
| W 109–96
| Chris Ross (24)
| June Mar Fajardo (18)
| Chris Ross (9)
| Batangas City Coliseum
| 7–2
|-bgcolor=ccffcc
| 10
| February 23
| Kia
| W 108–106
| Arwind Santos (27)
| Arwind Santos (12)
| Chris Ross (10)
| Smart Araneta Coliseum
| 8–2
|-bgcolor=ffcccc
| 11
| February 28
| Rain or Shine
| L 80–95
| June Mar Fajardo (19)
| June Mar Fajardo (10)
| Chris Ross (4)
| Mall of Asia Arena
| 8–3

Playoffs

Bracket

Game log

|-bgcolor=ccffcc
| 1
| March 6
| TNT
| W 106–93
| June Mar Fajardo (35)
| June Mar Fajardo (11)
| Chris Ross (7)
| Mall of Asia Arena
| 1–0

|-bgcolor=ccffcc
| 1
| March 9
| Barangay Ginebra
| W 102–90
| Arwind Santos (23)
| Arwind Santos (9)
| Chris Ross (8)
| Smart Araneta Coliseum
| 1–0
|-bgcolor=ccffcc
| 2
| March 11
| Barangay Ginebra
| W 104–102 (OT)
| June Mar Fajardo (33)
| June Mar Fajardo (19)
| Arwind Santos (5)
| Smart Araneta Coliseum
| 2–0
|-bgcolor=ffcccc
| 3
| March 13
| Barangay Ginebra
| L 87–95
| June Mar Fajardo (23)
| June Mar Fajardo (16)
| Marcio Lassiter (4)
| Mall of Asia Arena
| 2–1
|-bgcolor=ccffcc
| 4
| March 15
| Barangay Ginebra
| W 102–81
| Marcio Lassiter (23)
| June Mar Fajardo (13)
| Matt Ganuelas-Rosser (10)
| Mall of Asia Arena
| 3–1
|-bgcolor=ccffcc
| 5
| March 17
| Barangay Ginebra
| W 100–94
| June Mar Fajardo (25)
| Arwind Santos (13)
| Alex Cabagnot (5)
| Cuneta Astrodome
| 4–1

|-bgcolor=ffcccc
| 1
| March 23
| Magnolia
| L 103–105
| June Mar Fajardo (31)
| June Mar Fajardo (18)
| Alex Cabagnot (9)
| Smart Araneta Coliseum
| 0–1
|-bgcolor=ccffcc
| 2
| March 25
| Magnolia
| W 92–77
| Arwind Santos (24)
| June Mar Fajardo (13)
| Chris Ross (10)
| Mall of Asia Arena
| 1–1
|-bgcolor=ccffcc
| 3
| April 1
| Magnolia
| W 111–87
| Marcio Lassiter (24)
| June Mar Fajardo (17)
| Alex Cabagnot (8)
| Smart Araneta Coliseum
| 2–1
|-bgcolor=ccffcc
| 4
| April 4
| Magnolia
| W 84–80
| Alex Cabagnot (27)
| June Mar Fajardo (13)
| Chris Ross (7)
| Smart Araneta Coliseum
| 3–1
|-bgcolor=ccffcc
| 5
| April 6
| Magnolia
| W 108–99 (2OT)
| June Mar Fajardo (42)
| June Mar Fajardo (20)
| Chris Ross (11)
| Mall of Asia Arena
| 4–1

Commissioner's Cup

Eliminations

Standings

Game log

|-bgcolor=ffcccc
| 1
| May 9
| Meralco
| L 85–93
| Troy Gillenwater (19)
| Troy Gillenwater (14)
| Alex Cabagnot (7)
| Mall of Asia Arena
| 0–1
|-bgcolor=ffcccc
| 2
| May 13
| Rain or Shine
| L 119–123 (OT)
| Arwind Santos (29)
| Christian Standhardinger (15)
| Alex Cabagnot (9)
| Ynares Center
| 0–2
|-bgcolor=ffcccc
| 3
| May 19
| Alaska
| L 103–105
| Renaldo Balkman (32)
| Renaldo Balkman (13)
| Alex Cabagnot (4)
| Lamberto Macias Sports and Cultural Center
| 0–3
|- align="center"
|colspan="9" bgcolor="#bbcaff"|All-Star Break
|-bgcolor=ccffcc
| 4
| May 30
| Phoenix
| W 106–94
| Renaldo Balkman (35)
| Renaldo Balkman (17)
| Alex Cabagnot (7)
| Smart Araneta Coliseum
| 1–3

|-bgcolor=ccffcc
| 5
| June 3
| Barangay Ginebra
| W 104–97 (OT)
| Renaldo Balkman (27)
| June Mar Fajardo (19)
| Alex Cabagnot (8)
| Mall of Asia Arena
| 2–3
|-bgcolor=ccffcc
| 6
| June 6
| Columbian
| W 129–117
| June Mar Fajardo (37)
| Balkman, Fajardo (18)
| Alex Cabagnot (10)
| Smart Araneta Coliseum
| 3–3
|-bgcolor=ffcccc
| 7
| June 13
| GlobalPort
| L 94–98
| Renaldo Balkman (33)
| Renaldo Balkman (13)
| Renaldo Balkman (6)
| Mall of Asia Arena
| 3–4
|-bgcolor=ccffcc
| 8
| June 16
| TNT
| W 100–94
| Renaldo Balkman (43)
| Renaldo Balkman (15)
| Chris Ross (7)
| Mall of Asia Arena
| 4–4
|-bgcolor=ccffcc
| 9
| June 23
| NLEX
| W 125–114
| June Mar Fajardo (30)
| Renaldo Balkman (16)
| Chris Ross (8)
| Calasiao Sports Complex
| 5–4

|-bgcolor=ccffcc
| 10
| July 4
| Blackwater
| W 115–106
| Arwind Santos (23)
| Arwind Santos (15)
| Marcio Lassiter (6)
| Mall of Asia Arena
| 6–4
|-bgcolor=ffcccc
| 11
| July 7
| Magnolia
| L 97–101
| Renaldo Balkman (31)
| June Mar Fajardo (12)
| Alex Cabagnot (7)
| Smart Araneta Coliseum
| 6–5

Playoffs

Bracket

Game log

|-bgcolor=ccffcc
| 1
| July 9
| TNT
| W 121–110
| Renaldo Balkman (36)
| Renaldo Balkman (16)
| Cabagnot, Ross (6)
| Smart Araneta Coliseum
| 1–0
|-bgcolor=ccffcc
| 2
| July 11
| TNT
| W 106–102
| Renaldo Balkman (25)
| June Mar Fajardo (12)
| Chris Ross (10)
| Smart Araneta Coliseum
| 2–0

|-bgcolor=ccffcc
| 1
| July 14
| Alaska
| W 92–79
| June Mar Fajardo (17)
| Renaldo Balkman (11)
| Alex Cabagnot (5)
| Mall of Asia Arena
| 1–0
|-bgcolor=ccffcc
| 2
| July 16
| Alaska
| W 105–94
| Renaldo Balkman (31)
| June Mar Fajardo (18)
| Alex Cabagnot (8)
| Smart Araneta Coliseum
| 2–0
|-bgcolor=ffcccc
| 3
| July 20
| Alaska
| L 104–125
| Renaldo Balkman (28)
| June Mar Fajardo (15)
| Alex Cabagnot (7)
| Ynares Center
| 2–1
|-bgcolor=ccffcc
| 4
| July 22
| Alaska
| W 104–99
| June Mar Fajardo (26)
| Renaldo Balkman (16)
| Alex Cabagnot (9)
| Smart Araneta Coliseum
| 3–1

|-bgcolor=ffcccc
| 1
| July 27
| Barangay Ginebra
| L 99–127
| Renaldo Balkman (27)
| Renaldo Balkman (13)
| Alex Cabagnot (7)
| Smart Araneta Coliseum11,883
| 0–1
|-bgcolor=ccffcc
| 2
| July 29
| Barangay Ginebra
| W 134–109
| Alex Cabagnot (33)
| Renaldo Balkman (11)
| Alex Cabagnot (9)
| Smart Araneta Coliseum15,042
| 1–1
|-bgcolor=ccffcc
| 3
| August 1
| Barangay Ginebra
| W 132–94
| Renaldo Balkman (28)
| June Mar Fajardo (15)
| Marcio Lassiter (9)
| Smart Araneta Coliseum
| 2–1
|-bgcolor=ffcccc
| 4
| August 3
| Barangay Ginebra
| L 100–130
| Arwind Santos (22)
| June Mar Fajardo (14)
| Alex Cabagnot (6)
| Smart Araneta Coliseum12,288
| 2–2
|-bgcolor=ffcccc
| 5
| August 5
| Barangay Ginebra
| L 83–87
| Renaldo Balkman (34)
| Renaldo Balkman (20)
| Chris Ross (9)
| Smart Araneta Coliseum16,958
| 2–3
|-bgcolor=ffcccc
| 6
| August 8
| Barangay Ginebra
| L 77–87
| June Mar Fajardo (29)
| June Mar Fajardo (15)
| Brian Heruela (4)
| Mall of Asia Arena20,490
| 2–4

Governors' Cup

Eliminations

Standings

Game log

|-bgcolor=ccffcc
| 1
| September 1
| NLEX
| W 125–112
| Christian Standhardinger (36)
| Arizona Reid (13)
| Alex Cabagnot (9)
| Smart Araneta Coliseum
| 1–0
|-bgcolor=ffcccc
| 2
| September 5
| Blackwater
| L 100–103
| Arizona Reid (26)
| Arizona Reid (12)
| Alex Cabagnot (7)
| Smart Araneta Coliseum
| 1–1
|-bgcolor=ccffcc
| 3
| September 21
| Columbian
| W 143–119
| Arwind Santos (29)
| Arizona Reid (17)
| Arizona Reid (11)
| Smart Araneta Coliseum
| 2–1
|-bgcolor=ffcccc
| 4
| September 23
| Barangay Ginebra
| L 102–110
| Christian Standhardinger (25)
| Christian Standhardinger (11)
| Alex Cabagnot (9)
| Smart Araneta Coliseum
| 2–2
|-bgcolor=ffcccc
| 5
| September 30
| Magnolia
| L 108–109
| Kevin Murphy (37)
| Christian Standhardinger (16)
| Kevin Murphy (7)
| Smart Araneta Coliseum
| 2–3

|-bgcolor=ffcccc
| 6
| October 6
| Alaska
| L 119–127
| Kevin Murphy (45)
| Christian Standhardinger (13)
| Chris Ross (5)
| Ynares Center
| 2–4
|-bgcolor=ccffcc
| 7
| October 12
| Phoenix
| W 117–100
| Christian Standhardinger (29)
| Christian Standhardinger (14)
| Chris Ross (9)
| Mall of Asia Arena
| 3–4
|-bgcolor=ccffcc
| 8
| October 20
| TNT
| W 107–96
| Kevin Murphy (27)
| Christian Standhardinger (13)
| Kevin Murphy (9)
| Calasiao Sports Complex
| 4–4
|-bgcolor=ccffcc
| 9
| October 24
| NorthPort
| W 114–107
| Kevin Murphy (27)
| Christian Standhardinger (22)
| Kevin Murphy (7)
| Cuneta Astrodome
| 5–4
|-bgcolor=ccffcc
| 10
| October 27
| Rain or Shine
| W 109–97
| Kevin Murphy (28)
| Christian Standhardinger (18)
| Christian Standhardinger (4)
| Alonte Sports Arena
| 6–4

|-bgcolor=ffcccc
| 11
| November 3
| Meralco
| L 81–111
| Kevin Murphy (32)
| Christian Standhardinger (18)
| Alex Cabagnot (3)
| Smart Araneta Coliseum
| 6–5

Playoffs

Bracket

Game log

|-bgcolor=ffcccc
| 1
| November 7
| Alaska
| L 85–96
| Kevin Murphy (19)
| Christian Standhardinger (11)
| Chris Ross (7)
| Cuneta Astrodome
| 0–1

Transactions

Trades

Pre season

Commissioner's Cup

Free Agency

Addition

Subtraction

Rookie signings

Recruited imports

Awards

References

San Miguel Beermen seasons
San Miguel Beermen Season, 2017–18